Richard Ellinger (born September 27, 1970), better known by his ring name Meatball, is an American professional wrestler who is signed to Micro Championship Wrestling.

Early life
Ellinger was born in River Grove, Illinois, United States. His father, Richard Ellinger (1938-2020), was of German descent, and his mother, Frances Schmidt (1942–2009), was of German-Italian descent. He has an elder sister, Valerie Caso (née Ellinger; born 1966), and two elder step-brothers, Thomas and Bill Morton, from his mother's second marriage to Earl Morton.

Ellinger's mother and sister worked in the administrative side of a food chain, while his father worked in a lumber yard. Both his father and sister are two inches shorter than he is.

Ellinger attended River Grove Rhodes Elementary School until 1985 and East Leyden High School until 1989. After he left school, he traveled through the United States, Europe and Japan, which led to him taking a job as a cargo handler for a local airline from 1990 until 2009.

Professional wrestling career
Ellinger is 4 feet 6 inches tall, billed at weighing 292 lbs and adopts a brawler wrestling style.

In 2001, Ellinger received basic wrestling training from Nate Webb, made his ring debut  and thereafter wrestled part-time on federations including National Wrestling Alliance (NWA), Total Nonstop Action Wrestling (TNA), Independent Wrestling Revolution (IWR) and World Wrestling All-Stars (WWA). In August 2009, he joined Micro Championship Wrestling (MCW) and subsequently received training from Pat Tanaka.

In May 2013, Ellinger returned full-time to his previous job as a cargo handler in between doing wrestling shows for MCW.

Filmography

Championships and accomplishments
Micro Championship Wrestling
MCW Heavyweight Championship (2 times)

See also
Midget wrestling

References

External links

Meatball on Wrestlingdata.com
Meatball on Cagematch
Meatball on Obsessed With Wrestling
Micro Championship Wrestling website

1970 births
Living people
American people of German descent
American male professional wrestlers
Midget professional wrestlers
American professional wrestlers of Italian descent
Sportspeople from Cook County, Illinois
Sportspeople from Chicago
Professional wrestlers from Illinois
East Leyden High School alumni